Jean-Yves Besselat (21 December 1943 – 23 March 2012) was a member of the National Assembly of France.

Besselat was born in Quimper, Finistère.  He represented the Seine-Maritime department, and was a member of the Union for a Popular Movement.

References

1943 births
2012 deaths
Politicians from Quimper
Rally for the Republic politicians
Union for a Popular Movement politicians
Deputies of the 10th National Assembly of the French Fifth Republic
Deputies of the 11th National Assembly of the French Fifth Republic
Deputies of the 12th National Assembly of the French Fifth Republic
Deputies of the 13th National Assembly of the French Fifth Republic